In Greek mythology, Marathon, also Marathos or Marathus may refer to the same or four distinct characters who gave his name to Marathon, a town in Attica. 

 Marathus, the 14th king of Sicyon who reigned for 20 or 30 years. His predecessor was Marathonius and himself was succeeded by Echyreus, otherwise unknown. During his reign, Zeus slept with Io, the daughter of Iasus, and Cecrops founded Athenai in Euboea which was also called Diada or as Euboeans called it as Orchomenon. Marathus may be similar with the below Marathon. 
 Marathon, a king of Corinth after succeeding his father King Epopeus of Sicyon and Corinth. His mother was princess Antiope, the Theban daughter of Regent-king Nycteus. He was the brother of Oenope, and father of Corinthus and Sicyon. Marathon escaped from the lawless violence of his father and migrated to the sea coast of Attica (in Marathon). On his father's death, Marathon came back to Peloponnesus and divided his kingdom among his sons and returned to Attica where he had previously settled.
 Marathus, an Arcadian hero who accompanied the Dioscuri in their expedition into Attica to rescue Helen who had been abducted by Theseus. Marathus died when, in accordance with some oracle, he voluntarily devoted himself to be sacrificed in front of the line of battle. After him the township of Marathon was called.
 Marathos, son of Apollo and one of the possible eponyms of Marathon.

Notes

References 

 Apollodorus, The Library with an English Translation by Sir James George Frazer, F.B.A., F.R.S. in 2 Volumes, Cambridge, MA, Harvard University Press; London, William Heinemann Ltd. 1921. ISBN 0-674-99135-4. Online version at the Perseus Digital Library. Greek text available from the same website.
 Gaius Julius Hyginus, Fabulae from The Myths of Hyginus translated and edited by Mary Grant. University of Kansas Publications in Humanistic Studies. Online version at the Topos Text Project.
Lucius Mestrius Plutarchus, Lives with an English Translation by Bernadotte Perrin. Cambridge, MA. Harvard University Press. London. William Heinemann Ltd. 1914. 1. Online version at the Perseus Digital Library. Greek text available from the same website.
Pausanias, Description of Greece with an English Translation by W.H.S. Jones, Litt.D., and H.A. Ormerod, M.A., in 4 Volumes. Cambridge, MA, Harvard University Press; London, William Heinemann Ltd. 1918. . Online version at the Perseus Digital Library
 Pausanias, Graeciae Descriptio. 3 vols. Leipzig, Teubner. 1903.  Greek text available at the Perseus Digital Library.
 Suida, Suda Encyclopedia translated by Ross Scaife, David Whitehead, William Hutton, Catharine Roth, Jennifer Benedict, Gregory Hays, Malcolm Heath Sean M. Redmond, Nicholas Fincher, Patrick Rourke, Elizabeth Vandiver, Raphael Finkel, Frederick Williams, Carl Widstrand, Robert Dyer, Joseph L. Rife, Oliver Phillips and many others. Online version at the Topos Text Project.

Kings of Corinth
Kings in Greek mythology
Arcadian characters in Greek mythology
Attican characters in Greek mythology
Sicyonian characters in Greek mythology
Attic mythology
Corinthian mythology
Mythology of Sicyon
Theseus